Frost House may refer to:

in the United States
(by state, then city)

 Barnes-Frost House, Southington, Connecticut, listed on the National Register of Historic Places (NRHP)
 Levi B. Frost House, Southington, Connecticut, NRHP-listed
 Frost House (Thibodaux, Louisiana), listed on the NRHP in Lafourche Parish, Louisiana
 Cooper-Frost-Austin House, Cambridge, Massachusetts, NRHP-listed
 David Frost House, Cambridge, Massachusetts, NRHP-listed
 Robert Frost House, Cambridge, Massachusetts, NRHP-listed
 Walter Frost House, Cambridge, Massachusetts, NRHP-listed
 Hunter-Frost House, Enterprise, Mississippi, listed on the NRHP in Clarke County
 George Nelson Frost House, Cherry Creek, New York
 Holt-Frost House, Burlington, North Carolina, listed on the NRHP in Alamance County, North Carolina
 Josiah Frost House, Menallen Township, Pennsylvania, NRHP-listed
 John Frost House, Brentwood, Tennessee, NRHP-listed

See also
 Frost Farm (disambiguation)